Red clay, or Ultisol, is a type of soil.

Red clay may also refer to:

Red clay used in pottery
Pelagic red clay, a type of pelagic (deepwater) sediment
Red Clay State Historic Park, Tennessee, U.S.
Red Clay, Georgia, an unincorporated community
Red clay, a type of clay court in tennis
Hong Ni (红泥, literally, "red clay"), a type of Chinese clay used in pottery, see Yixing clay

See also
Red Clay (disambiguation)